Laila is a 1929 Norwegian black and white silent drama film.  The film was written, directed, and edited by George Schnéevoigt. Mona Mårtenson, Tryggve Larssen, and Harald Schwenzen played the leading roles.

Plot 
Shopkeeper Lind is taking his daughter on a long journey to a distant church to be baptized. His daughter is with a servant in the last sled, which trails behind out of sight and comes under attack by a wolf pack. In the confusion that arises as they flee, the baby falls out of the sled. Jåmpa, a Sámi man, finds the baby and takes her to his Sámi employer, the rich Aslag Laagje, who adopts her to be his daughter. Laagje baptizes the child as Laila. A year later, Laagje visits Lind and his bereaved wife, and realizes that Laila is their daughter. He returns Laila to them, but not long afterwards the plague decimates the village and kills her parents. Jåmpa goes to the village and finds Laila in the care of an elderly couple. He takes Laila back to Laagje, and she grows up together with Laagje's adopted son, Mellet, who falls in love with her. Laila, however, eventually meets her cousin Anders Lind and become fond of him. After Anders helps rescue her after a canoe accident, they arrange to rendezvous at midnight, but Anders cannot come because his father falls ill and dies. Laila believes he has betrayed her and agrees to marry Mellet. With the aid of Jåmpa and at the last moment, Anders arrives at the church just before the wedding ceremony concludes. Laila and Anders resolve all and become engaged.

About the film 
Laila was directed and edited by George Schnéevoigt, who also wrote the film's script based on Jens Andreas Friis's . The interiors were recorded in Nordisk Film's studio in Valby, Denmark and the exteriors of Outer Billefjord and Skoganvarre (both in Porsanger), Karasjok, Bossekop, Skjærvøy, Geilo, and Ustaoset.

The film premiered on 6 October 1929 at the cinema Palace in Denmark. The title was named Laila in Denmark, Norway, and Sweden, Laila - Die Tochter des Nordens in Germany, and Laila, La Figlia del Nord in Italy. In Norway, the film was distributed by Norrøna-Film AS, in Sweden by AB Svensk Filmindustri, and in Denmark by International Film (Sophus Madsen).

Several of the actors in the film had previously worked with Schnéevoigt in the 1928 film .

The movie was released in 2011 on DVD by Flickeralley.com.

Cast 

 Mona Mårtenson – Laila
 Tryggve Larssen – Jåmpa
 Harald Schwenzen – Anders Lind
 Peter Malberg – Aslag Laagje
 Cally Monrad – Mor Laagje, Aslag's wife
 Henry Gleditsch – Mellet, Laagje's foster child
 Finn Bernhoft – C.O. Lind, trader
  – Lind's wife
 Ibe Brekke – Magga, servant at  the Lind house
 Aslag Aslagsen Sara – Lasse, servant at  the Lind house
 Rasmus Christiansen – Jens Lind, C.O.'s brother
 Alice O'Fredericks – Inger, Anders's sister
 Mattis Morotaja – Mellet as a boy

Music 
 "Laila's love song", music: Einar Ellgen and Fred Bjønner (Lars Minsaas), arranged by Kristian Hauger.
 "Lullaby for Laila", music: .

When the film was released on DVD in 2011, it featured newly composed music by Robert Israel, inspired by Edvard Grieg.

References

External links

1929 films
Films set in Norway
Norwegian black-and-white films
Norwegian drama films
Norwegian silent films
Pages with unreviewed translations
1929 drama films
Films directed by George Schnéevoigt
Silent drama films